Fast Lane is a 1987 arcade game created by Konami. The game is a clone of Sega's Head On from 1979 with improved graphics and some additional features. The player controls a red sports car that attempts to avoid crashing head on with a blue truck.

References

External links

1987 video games
Arcade video games
Arcade-only video games
Konami games
Maze games
Video game clones
Konami arcade games
Video games developed in Japan